Stephen Cartwright (28 December 1947 – 12 February 2004) was a British children's book illustrator who illustrated more than 150 books which sold millions of copies worldwide.  His illustrations are noted for being instantly recognizable and usually depicting open-faced, innocent-looking children and animals. Cartwright was born in Bolton, England, and studied at Rochdale College of Art before moving to London where he trained at Saint Martin's School of Art and then at the Royal College of Art. Throughout his 27 years of book illustration, he was closely associated with Usborne Publishing, whose First Thousand Words series was Cartwright's first international success and was translated into 55 languages.

Selected books illustrated by Stephen Cartwright
 Civardi, Anne; Graham-Campbell, James (2003). The Usborne Time Traveller Viking Raiders. Usborne. .
 Rawson, Christopher; Stephen, Cartwright (1979). The Usborne Book of Dragons. Usborne. .
 Rawson, Christopher; Stephen, Cartwright. The Usborne Book of Witches. Usborne. 
 Rawson, Christopher; Stephen, Cartwright. The Usborne Book of Giants. Usborne.
 Rawson, Christopher; Stephen, Cartwright. The Usborne Book of Princes & Princesses. Usborne.
 Rawson, Christopher; Stephen, Cartwright. The Usborne Book of Gnomes, Goblins & Fairies. Usborne.
 Rawson, Christopher; Stephen, Cartwright (1980). The Usborne Book of Wizards. Usborne. .    
 Rawson, Christopher; Stephen, Cartwright (1981). The Usborne Book of Robbers. Usborne. .

External links

References

1947 births
2004 deaths
British illustrators
20th-century British painters
British male painters
21st-century British painters
People from Bolton
Alumni of Saint Martin's School of Art
20th-century British male artists
21st-century British male artists